Pagiophyllum is a form genus of fossil coniferous plant foliage. Plants of the genus have been variously assigned to several different conifer groups including Araucariaceae and Cheirolepidiaceae. They were found around the globe during the Carboniferous to the Cretaceous period.

Location of palaeontological sites
In Paleorrota geopark in Brazil. Upper Triassic period, the Santa Maria Formation.

References

Prehistoric gymnosperm genera
Araucariaceae